Dioryctria disclusa, the webbing coneworm or rusty pine cone moth, is a species of moth of the family Pyralidae. It is found in North America from New Brunswick to Florida, west to Texas and north to Manitoba.

The wingspan is about 24 mm. The forewings are yellowish orange inside the antemedial line and darker orange beyond this line. The hindwings are pale grey with a white fringe.

The larvae feed on the developing cones of Pinus species. They are brown with a thin black band across each abdominal segment and a dark brown head.

Gallery

References

Moths described in 1953
disclusa